Entrepot Secondary School is a secondary school located in Entrepot, Castries, Saint Lucia. The school educates about 635 students in Form 1 through Form 5. The principal since 2003 is Arthur Scott.

The school first opened as Entrepot Junior Secondary School on 10 January 1972. It became a full secondary school in 1984.

Notable alumni
Darvin Edwards, Olympic high jumper
Levern Spencer, Olympic high jumper

References

1972 establishments in Saint Lucia
Buildings and structures in Castries
Educational institutions established in 1972
Schools in Saint Lucia